Alwyn Cecil Kurts (28 October 1915 – 4 May 2000) was an Australian drama and comedy actor of radio, television and film, best remembered for his role as gruff Inspector Colin Fox in the TV series Homicide.

Biography
Kurts' father, David Day, was a well-known radio personality in the postwar years.
Kurts worked on breakfast radio on Perth station 6PR in 1942. He then became an accredited war correspondent reporting from Burma, New Guinea and the Philippines. After the war he moved to 3XY with his program Raising a Husband. 

His television career started with the television version of his radio show Raising a Husband (which was pushed off air by the success of Graham Kennedy), then Hutton's Family Quiz, Don't Argue and Fighting Words. He made the successful transition to television in Homicide; after one 1968 appearance as criminal Frank Inglis, he took on the role of country-based Inspector Colin Fox for one episode the same year. Kurts then returned as a core cast member the following year, playing Fox, now with the additional back story that he had worked in Homicide twenty years earlier and was now seeking a change after the recent death of his wife. 'Colin Fox' formally assumed the Inspector role on 27 May. Kurts remained with the show for four years, after which he starred in another Crawfords production, the comedy The Last of the Australians. In 1982 he appeared in the Australian TV drama Cop Shop.
For a brief time, he was the Beast in the Australian version of the television panel show Beauty and the Beast.
Kurts also appeared in the 1979 movie Tim starring Mel Gibson. Late in life he had key roles in the films Spotswood and Road to Nhill.

Kurts supported the 1972 campaign for the election of Gough Whitlam and the Labor Party.

Death 
Kurts died on 4 May 2000, aged 84 in Melbourne, Australia, from liver failure.

Awards
In 1979, Kurts won the Australian Film Institute Award for AACTA Award for Best Actor in a Supporting Role for his role as the father of Mel Gibson's character in the film Tim.

Filmography

Film

Television

References

External links

1915 births
2000 deaths
Australian male television actors
Australian male radio actors
Male actors from Melbourne
20th-century Australian male actors